Huỳnh Thị Thanh Thủy (born 1 July 2002) is a model and beauty pageant titleholder who was crowned Miss Vietnam 2022.

Early life and education
Huỳnh Thị Thanh Thủy was born on 1 July 2002 in Da Nang. She is currently studying at The University of Danang - University of Foreign Language Studies in Da Nang.

Pageantry

Miss Vietnam 2022
She was crowned Miss Vietnam 2022 on December 23, 2022 at the Phu Tho Indoor Stadium in Ho Chi Minh City. She succeeded outgoing by Miss Vietnam 2020, Đỗ Thị Hà. During the pageant, she entered the top 5 of Fast Track Beauty with a Purpose and Multimedia and won the Sport award.

References

External links

2002 births
Living people
Miss Vietnam winners
People from Da Nang
Vietnamese beauty pageant winners
Vietnamese female models
21st-century Vietnamese women